Fahraj County is in Kerman province, Iran. The capital of the county is the city of Fahraj. At the 2006 census, the region's population (as Fahraj District and Chadegal Rural District of Bam County) was 41,291 in 9,568 households. The following census in 2011 counted 68,038 people in 17,521 households, by which time Fahraj District and Chadegal Rural District had been separated from the Bam County to form Fahraj County. At the 2016 census, the county's population was 67,096 in 17,195 households.

Administrative divisions

The population history and structural changes of Fahraj County's administrative divisions over three consecutive censuses are shown in the following table. The latest census shows two districts, four rural districts, and one city.

References

 

Counties of Kerman Province